The Battle of Grand Gulf was fought on April 29, 1863, during the American Civil War. During Major General Ulysses S. Grant's Vicksburg campaign, Union Army forces had failed in attempts to bypass the strategic city of Vicksburg, Mississippi.  Grant decided move his army south, cross the Mississippi River, and then advance on Vicksburg. Seven Union Navy ironclad warships commanded by Admiral David Dixon Porter bombarded Confederate fortifications at Grand Gulf, Mississippi, in preparation for a crossing of the river.  Union fire was able to silence one of the two Confederate fortifications at Grand Gulf, but the position was still strong enough that Grant decided to cross the river elsewhere.

The next day, Union forces crossed the Mississippi River at Bruinsburg, Mississippi.  A Union victory in the Battle of Port Gibson on May 1 secured the beachhead and forced the abandonment of the position at Grand Gulf, which became a Union supply point.  Grant's command moved inland, and after defeating Confederate forces in the Battle of Champion Hill on May 16, began the Siege of Vicksburg two days later.  Vicksburg surrendered on July 4, marking a major Confederate defeat and a turning point in the war. The Grand Gulf battlefield is preserved in Grand Gulf Military State Park, which was listed on the National Register of Historic Places in 1972.

Background

Early in the American Civil War, Union military leadership developed the Anaconda Plan, which was a strategy to defeat the Confederate States of America. A significant component of this strategy was controlling the Mississippi River.  Much of the Mississippi Valley fell under Union control in early 1862 after the capture of New Orleans, Louisiana, and several land victories.  The strategically important city of Vicksburg, Mississippi was still in Confederate hands, serving as both a strong defensive position by commanding the river and as the linchpin between the two halves of the Confederacy. Union Navy elements were sent upriver from New Orleans in May to try to take the city, a move that was ultimately unsuccessful.  In late June, a joint army-navy expedition returned to make another campaign against Vicksburg.  Union Navy leadership decided that the city could not be taken without more infantrymen, who were not forthcoming. An attempt to cut a canal across a meander of the river, bypassing Vicksburg, failed.

In late November, about 40,000 Union infantry commanded by Major General Ulysses S. Grant began moving south towards Vicksburg from a starting point in Tennessee.  Grant ordered a retreat after a supply depot and part of his supply line were destroyed during the Holly Springs Raid and Forrest's West Tennessee Raid.  Meanwhile, another arm of the expedition under the command of Major General William T. Sherman left Memphis, Tennessee on the same day as the Holly Springs Raid and traveled down the Mississippi River.  After diverting up the Yazoo River, Sherman's men began skirmishing with Confederate soldiers defending a line of hills above the Chickasaw Bayou.  A Union attack on December 29 was defeated decisively at the Battle of Chickasaw Bayou, and Sherman's men withdrew on January 1, 1863.

By late March, further attempts to bypass Vicksburg had failed.  Grant then considered three plans: to withdraw to Memphis and retry the overland route through northern Mississippi; to move south along the west side of the Mississippi River, cross below Vicksburg, and then strike for the city; or to make an amphibious assault across the river against Vicksburg.  An assault across the river risked heavy casualties, and a withdrawal to Memphis could be politically disastrous if the public perceived such a movement as a retreat. Grant then decided upon the downstream crossing.  The advance along the west bank of the Mississippi began on March 29, and was spearheaded by Major General John A. McClernand's troops.  The movement down the river was masked by decoy operations such as Steele's Greenville expedition, Streight's Raid, and Grierson's Raid.  Confederate regional commander John C. Pemberton fell for the Union decoys (especially Grierson's Raid), and lost touch with the true tactical situation, believing Grant was withdrawing.

Prelude

On multiple occasions in mid-1862, Confederate field artillery harassed Union Navy vessels from Grand Gulf, Mississippi, which was located along the Mississippi River to the south of Vicksburg. The town was largely burned by Union troops attempting to suppress the Confederate forces.  In early March 1863, the Confederates decided to  rebuild fortifications at Grand Gulf, and the brigade of Brigadier General John S. Bowen was transferred there.  By the middle of the month, Bowen's troops and a number of slaves were working on building new defenses and strengthening the existing ones.  Heavy cannon were transferred to the position, but before those guns could arrive, a skirmish occurred on March 19 between the Confederate defenders and two Union Navy ships: the sloop-of-war USS Hartford and the schooner USS Albatross. The exchange was not protracted and the Confederates suffered no loss, while the Union had eight men killed or wounded on Hartford.  Soon afterwards, five heavy cannon arrived at Grand Gulf: two 8-inch pieces and three 32-pounder rifled cannon.

In early April, Bowen became aware of Grant's movement down the west side of the Mississippi River, and sent part of his force under the command of Francis Cockrell across the river on April 4 to counter the Union movement.  Bowen informed Pemberton of Grant's advance, but the latter officer disregarded the information.  The Union Navy forces cooperating with Grant, which were commanded by David Dixon Porter, were positioned north of Vicksburg, but there was a need for vessels to move south for operations near Port Hudson, Louisiana, as well as to provide a stronger protecting force for the transports that would ferry troops in Grant's planned crossing of the Mississippi River.  Beginning two hours after nightfall on April 16, Porter ran a number of vessels past the batteries at Vicksburg, with the loss of only a transport and a barge. Pemberton learned of the passing of the batteries, and began to develop a clearer picture of the true strategic situation.  Grand Gulf was reinforced, and with the return of Cockrell's command from the far side of the river, there were about 4,200 Confederate troops there.

After dark on April 22, additional transports were run down the river past Vicksburg: one transport and a number of barges were lost, and all of the surviving transports were damaged. Porter had been prepared to bombard Grand Gulf on April 23, with McClernand providing an infantry force to land there afterwards, but believing a false report of the Confederates having 12,000 men at Grand Gulf, called off the attack.  McClernand observed Grand Gulf later that day, as did Grant the next day.  Both determined the Confederate position was not as strong as had been reported.  Union forces moved further downriver, and opened a base of operations at Hard Times Landing.  By April 28, most of McClernand's men had been loaded onto transports in preparation for the river crossing. Hoping to further distract the Confederates, Grant suggested another feint: this one to be made by Sherman up the Yazoo River.  While Grant had some hesitations about such a feint, believing that reports of it might be misconstrued by the Union public as another Chickasaw Bayou-style defeat, Sherman continued with the operation.  Sherman's movement resulted in the Battle of Snyder's Bluff, which saw Union warships and transports loaded with infantry move up the Yazoo River on April 29 and skirmish with Confederate forces during the next two days.

On April 28, Pemberton finally realized the importance of the Union buildup near Grand Gulf. He ordered Carter L. Stevenson to prepare a 5,000-man force to be sent to Grand Gulf at Bowen's discretion, but Stevenson still regarded the Union move south as a feint in preparation for an assault directly against Vicksburg. Bowen lacked a cavalry force for scouting, as the cavalry at Grand Gulf had been sent elsewhere to chase down Grierson's Raid. The work on the defenses at Grand Gulf had resulted in a much stronger position than had been there at the beginning of March. Two forts were the strongpoints of the fortification. The stronger was known as Fort Cobun, and the other as Fort Wade. It mounted four cannontwo 32-pounder guns, an 8-inch Dahlgren gun, and a 30-pounder Parrott riflewhich were crewed by Battery A, 1st Louisiana Heavy Artillery. This fort mounted a 100-pounder Blakely rifle, another 8-inch Dahlgren piece, and two more 32-pounders. These cannon were worked by Wade's Missouri Battery and Guibor's Missouri Battery. In between the two forts were two rows of rifle pits and a covered passageway. The 3rd Missouri Infantry Regiment held this position. A secondary line of rifle pits to the rear on a ridge was defended by five smaller Parrott rifles and the 6th Missouri Infantry Regiment. Two more cannon and the 1st Confederate Battalion were position on a bluff to guard the mouth of the Big Black River, with some sharpshooters from Arkansas, Dawson's Missouri Battery, and a dismounted cavalry unit positioned further up the Big Black River. Porter believed the Confederates were too well-prepared for an attack against Grand Gulf to be worthwhile, and instead suggested that the army march further south, accompanied by the navy's ironclad warships to cover the movement of its transports. However, no suitable crossing point north of Grand Gulf could be discovered, and Grant believed that the position would not be difficult to take, so the assault against Grand Gulf would occur as planned.

Battle

At 7:00 a.m. on April 29, seven Union Navy vessels led by Porter moved down the river towards the positions at Grand Gulf.  Roughly 30,000 Union infantry were in the Hard Times Landing area, of which about 10,000 were on transports.  The men on the transports, which had pulled away from the landing and were sheltered behind a peninsula, were intended to cross the river and occupy Grand Gulf once the Confederate batteries were subdued. USS Pittsburgh was in the lead, followed by USS Louisville, USS Carondelet, and USS Mound City.  A second wave composed of USS Benton, USS Tuscumbia, and USS Lafayette followed. A total of 81 cannon were carried by these vessels, compared to 13 in the Confederate positions.  The naval forces also had the advantage in size of cannon: the majority of the Confederate cannon were 30-pounders or smaller, as opposed to the median Union cannon being a 42-pounder. The ironclads first targeted Fort Cobun, then Pittsburgh, Louisville, Carondelet, and Mound City moved to focus on Fort Wade, while the other three remained focused on Fort Cobun.  After passing Fort Cobun, the ships turned so that their bows pointed upstream.  The lead Union vessels opened fire at about 7:50, with Fort Cobun responding about 25 minutes later.  Currents in the river caught some of the Union vessels, forcing them to spin in circles while the Confederate fired upon them.  After the shooting started, the 12th Arkansas Sharpshooter Battalion was moved forward from a reserve position into rifle pits near Fort Cobun.

While Pittsburgh, Louisville, Carondelet, and Mound City each carried 13 guns, the positioning of the guns on the ships allowed a maximum of four guns at a time to be aimed at the Confederate fortifications, reducing the Union firepower.  By 10:00 a.m., Fort Wade was knocked out of action.  One of the large cannons in Fort Wade had exploded, the fortifications themselves had been severely damaged, and Colonel William F. Wade, commanding the post, had been decapitated by Union fire.  The surviving cannons at Fort Wade had been buried under earth from the damaged fortifications.  The four Union vessels that had silenced Fort Wade moved upriver to face the remaining Confederate fort, which fought on.  A Confederate shot struck Benton, destroying the ship's wheel. Confederate troops in the rifle pits also fired into the Union vessels. Around 1:00 p.m., Fort Cobun decreased its fire due to ammunition shortages.  However, Porter and Grant decided not to attempt an amphibious landing against Grand Gulf due to the strength of the Confederate position.  Despite the damage and the ammunition shortage, the Confederate batteries were still capable of repulsing a landing of the transports.  During the action, Porter had been struck in the back of his head with a shell fragment; the painful wound caused him to use his sword as a cane.  The naval vessels had fired more than 2,300 shots during the bombardment.

Confederate fire had focused the heaviest on Benton, Pittsburgh, and Tuscumbia. The former vessel had taken 47 hits, Pittsburgh 35, and the latter over 80. Tuscumbia was poorly built (for instance, the spikes holding the ship's iron plating on were not secured with nuts), and had been badly damaged and knocked out of the fighting. Historians Michael B. Ballard and Ed Bearss state that the Union forces lost 18 men killed and 57 wounded, for a total of 75, with historians William L. Shea and Terrence J. Winschel instead placing Union casualties at 24 killed and 56 wounded, including a few men from the army serving on the warships in a volunteer capacity.  According to Ballard and Bearss, Confederate losses totaled 22: three dead and 19 wounded, while historian Donald L. Miller and Shea and Winschel states that the Confederates lost 18 men, with the difference being in wounded.

Aftermath

After the naval bombardment was unable to neutralize the Confederate position at Grand Gulf, the troops on the transports returned to dry land. Later that day, the Union transports and barges were run downriver, under the covering fire of Porter's gunboats.  The vessels were able to make it downriver safely; Porter lost one man in the affair and the Confederates lost none.  Grant's infantrymen marched downriver to Disharoon's plantation, where the transports had been gathered after passing Grand Gulf.  Two crossing points below Grand Gulf were considered by Grant: Rodney, Mississippi, or Bruinsburg, Mississippi.  Bowen expected Union troops to cross at the former.  Discussions between Union scouts and an African American, who was possibly named Bob, yielded the information that a usable road ran from Bruinsburg to Port Gibson, so Bruinsburg was selected as the crossing point.

On the morning of April 30, the Bruinsburg crossing began.  McClernand's corps and a portion of Major General James B. McPherson's corps led the way.  By the next morning, 24,000 Union soldiers had crossed the river without opposition.  More of McPherson's men crossed on May 1. Late on April 29, expecting a Union crossing of the river, Bowen sent a detachment from his command to hold Port Gibson, and the next day sent reinforcements that had arrived from Vicksburg to that place as well.  Early on the morning of May 1, the Confederates near Port Gibson encountered McClernand's advancing troops.  The ensuing Battle of Port Gibson was a hard-fought Union victory.  Winning the battle protected the Union bridgehead and rendered Grand Gulf indefensible.  Pemberton ordered Bowen to abandon the position, and the Confederates spiked the cannons there early on May 3.  Union forces occupied the position after the Confederates withdrew, and it became a supply point during the ongoing campaign.  Portions of Sherman's corps crossed the river at Grand Gulf late on May 6 and into May 7.

Grant's men swung inland towards the railroad supplying Vicksburg, but after the Battle of Raymond on May 12, Grant decided to swing east to disperse the Confederate reinforcements gathering at Jackson, Mississippi.  Jackson was taken on May 14, and two days later, Pemberton's attempt to defeat Grant outside of Vicksburg was defeated in the climactic Battle of Champion Hill.  The Siege of Vicksburg began on May 18 and ended in a Confederate surrender on July 4.  The capture of Vicksburg divided the Confederacy along the Mississippi River, and along with the Union victory at the Siege of Port Hudson, gave the Union control of the Mississippi River.  Together with a Confederate defeat at the Battle of Gettysburg on July 3, the fall of Vicksburg marked a turning point in the war.  The war ended in 1865 with a Confederate defeat.

The site of the battle is preserved by Grand Gulf Military State Park.  The park contains the land where forts Wade and Cobun were located, as well as an observation tower, a museum, and remains of the old town of Grand Gulf.  The park was listed on the National Register of Historic Places on April 11,1972.

Notes

References

References

Further reading
CWSAC Report Update

Vicksburg campaign
Battles of the Western Theater of the American Civil War
Claiborne County, Mississippi
Confederate victories of the American Civil War
Grand Gulf
Grand Gulf
Conflicts in 1863
1863 in Mississippi
Riverine warfare
April 1863 events